Roxana Mihaela Oprea (born 4 December 1988) is a Romanian footballer who plays as a goalkeeper. She has been a member of the Romania women's national team.

References

1988 births
Living people
Romanian women's footballers
Women's association football goalkeepers
Romania women's international footballers
Romanian expatriate footballers
Romanian expatriate sportspeople in Greece
Expatriate women's footballers in Greece
Romanian expatriate sportspeople in Austria
Expatriate women's footballers in Austria
FCU Olimpia Cluj players
FSK St. Pölten-Spratzern players